Alan Dean may refer to:

 Alan Dean (athlete) (born 1940), British Olympic athlete
 Alan Dean (cricketer) (born 1962), English cricketer
 Alan Dean (ornithologist), British ornithologist
 Alan Dean (priest) (born 1938), Archdeacon of the Army
 Alan Dean (tattoo artist), British tattoo artist